Saadia ben Levi Azankot was a 17th-century Jewish Moroccan Orientalist.

Biography
Azankot lived in Holland in the first half of the seventeenth century, where he was teacher of Jewish literature to Johann Heinrich Hottinger.

He published a versified paraphrase of the Book of Esther in Amsterdam in 1647, rhymed in the form of an acrostic, under the title Iggeret ha-Purim. The Bodleian Library holds two manuscripts bearing his name: one containing a transcription of Maimonides' Guide for the Perplexed in Arabic characters, which Azankot made for Jacobus Golius between 1644 and 1645 and contains at the end a poem with Azankot's acrostic; the other manuscript containing Hebrew translation of the Lamiat al-Ayam of Husain bin Ali, appended to a printed copy of the same.

References
 

17th-century Dutch people
17th-century Moroccan Jews
Dutch Arabists
Dutch Hebraists
Dutch Sephardi Jews
Hebrew-language writers
Jewish orientalists
Moroccan emigrants to the Netherlands
1629 births
1650 deaths